The College Hockey Showcase was an annual college Division I men's ice hockey event between four teams that were members of the  Big Ten.

The tournament was conceived as a competition between Michigan, Michigan State, Minnesota and Wisconsin partly as a renewal of old WCHA rivalries and partly as a competition between Big Ten schools. The two WCHA teams would play the two CCHA teams once each during the Thanksgiving weekend with all games counting as part of a non-conference schedule. The showcase took place a different locations for the first four years, being held at a neutral venue with one of the schools serving as the host, but moved to the university sites beginning in 1997. The final competitions in 2010 took place at the home sites of Minnesota and Wisconsin.

The tournament operated from 1993 through 2010 with its discontinuation announced shortly after Penn State University declared that they were to sponsor men's and women's ice hockey beginning with the 2012–13 season. With the expectation that the Big Ten would form an ice hockey conference since there were now the requisite 6 teams participating at the Division I level the showcase lost its importance and Wisconsin declined to renew the event for the 2011 season.

Despite being a Big Ten member, Ohio State had never been a rival of either Minnesota or Wisconsin (having never played in the same conference as either university) and did not participate in the Showcase.

Yearly results

Note: * denotes overtimeNote: † home and away teams only apply to the events from 1997 onwards

Team Records

References

College ice hockey tournaments in the United States